Ross Munnelly (born 23 December 1982) is an Irish sportsperson from County Laois. He plays Gaelic football for his club Arles–Kilcruise and previously for the Laois senior team. In 2003, he was part of the Laois team that won the Leinster Senior Football Championship title for the first time since 1946. He usually plays at wing forward for Laois.

Playing career

Club
In 2003, Munnelly starred when his club Arles–Kilcruise won the Laois Senior Football Championship title.

Inter-county
Munnelly emerged on to the scene in 2000 as part of the Laois minor team and in 2002 and 2003 he was part of the Laois Under-21 team.  In 2003, he joined the Laois senior football team, helping them to a Leinster Senior Football Championship.

In 2005, he captained Laois to the final of that year's Leinster Senior Football Championship; they were beaten by Dublin. The team went on to defeat Derry in the All-Ireland Senior Football Championship, before being beaten by Armagh in the All-Ireland Senior Football Championship quarter-final.

In 2006, Laois were defeated by Mayo in their All-Ireland Senior Football Championship quarter-final encounter. It was all downhill from there. Following this, Laois were knocked out in the All-Ireland qualifiers by Derry in 2007 and by Down in both 2008 and 2009.

As of the conclusion of the 2022 season, Munnelly was the joint longest serving inter-county player (alongside Niall McNamee of Offaly).

Munnelly retired from inter-county football at the end of the 2022 season.

International rules
In 2005, Munnelly was chosen to represent Ireland in the International Rules Series away to Australia, and in 2006 he was nominated for an All Stars Award. Though not chosen on the team, he was called up to travel to Dubai as a replacement in January 2007.

He played twice for Ireland against Australia in the 2013 International Rules Series, as Ireland romped to a record-breaking victory.

Career Statistics 

 As of 26 July 2022

References

1982 births
Living people
Alumni of St Patrick's College, Maynooth
Alumni of Dublin City University
Arles-Kilcruise Gaelic footballers
Gaelic football forwards
Irish international rules football players
Laois inter-county Gaelic footballers
DCU Gaelic footballers